Ranunculus lingua, the greater spearwort, great spearwort, tongue-leaved crowfoot, or water buttercup, is a plant species in the family Ranunculaceae native to temperate areas of Europe, Siberia and through to the western Himalayas. A cultivar (or perhaps a traditional variety) called 'Grandiflorus', the large-flowered greater spearwort, has 6cm flowers and is favored by gardeners.

References

lingua
Flora of Europe
Flora of Siberia
Flora of Central Asia
Flora of West Himalaya
Garden plants of Europe